101 Dalmatians is a musical with music and lyrics by Douglas Hodge and a book by Johnny McKnight from a stage adaptation by Zinnie Harris, based on the 1956 children's novel The Hundred and One Dalmatians by Dodie Smith.

Background
The musical was originally announced to premiere at the Open Air Theatre in Regent's Park (which is where the story is set) from 16 May to 21 June 2020, with an official opening night on 27 May. Kate Fleetwood was announced to play Cruella de Vil. However, the production was postponed due to the COVID-19 pandemic and was later rescheduled to run from 26 May to 20 June 2021 with previews beginning 15 May. On January 21, 2021, the 2021 run of the production was cancelled due to the continued COVID-19 restrictions.

On 18 March 2022, the full cast was announced, including Kate Fleetwood as Cruella de Vil.

Production history

World premiere: London (2022)
The musical premiered at the Regent's Park Open Air Theatre, with previews beginning 12 July 2022 and an official opening on 21 July 2022. It ran until 28 August 2022.

The production was directed by Timothy Sheader and choreographed by Liam Steel, with set design by Colin Richmond, costumes  by Katrina Linsdsay, and puppetry design and direction by Toby Olié.

Cast and characters

Musical Numbers

Act 1
 Go Wild/Now Then
 Wrong Tree
 It's My Treat
 Bury That Bone
 Bite It Back
 Turn Round Three Times
 Litterbugs
 Heads Or Tails
 The English Pub
 Two Bad Criminals
 Litterbugs (Reprise)
 Für Fur

Act 2
 Achoo
 W.W.D.D
 Dogtra
 What The Bleep
 Delay Her
 I Can Smell Puppy
 All Of Our Kisses
 Turn Around Three Times (Reprise)
 Cruella's Demise
 Bury That Bone/Litterbugs (Reprise)
 One Hundred and One

References

101 Dalmatians
Musicals based on novels
British musicals
Plays set in England
2022 musicals